Kanika Maheshwari (born 24 April 1981) is an Indian television actress.  She is best known for her roles in serials like Kahaani Ghar Ghar Kii, Raja Ki Aayegi Baraat, Kabhi Aaye Na Judaai, Viraasat, Geet - Hui Sabse Parayi and Diya Aur Baati Hum. Kanika won Zee Gold Awards (2012-2013). She reprised her role of Meenakshi Vikram Rathi in the sequel of Diya Aur Baati Hum, Tu Sooraj, Main Saanjh Piyaji.

Early life
Maheshwari was born in a Marwari Maheshwari Family. She is an Indian Television actor and has made memorable appearances as varied characters of the years. She was born in Aligarh from where her family moved to New Delhi, she is the only child of her parents.  After her graduation, she learned the fine art of Vaastu Shastra and Color Therapy before dabbling into acting. At the academy she learned performing arts and experimented her talents, she was encouraged  by her teachers and mentors to find her place in Mumbai and create a niche for herself in the industry.
Kanica did just that with her streak of award winning roles and shows over the years. Known for her hard work, punctuality and persistence – her cheerful spirit brings new shades to evlays.

Personal life
Kanika married businessman Ankur Ghai in January 2012. She gave birth to a boy in April 2015.

Television

Web series

Awards
For the role of Meenakshi Rathi in Diya Aur Baati Hum, Maheshwari has won following awards.

References

External links
 

Living people
Indian television actresses
1981 births
People from Aligarh
Actresses in Hindi television
Actors from Mumbai